My Horse, My Gun, Your Widow is a 1972 Spanish Eastmancolor western film directed by Juan Bosch (who used the pseudonym John Wood), scored by Bruno Nicolai, written by Sauro Scavolini, and starring Craig Hill. It was shot between July and August 1972.

Cast

References

External links
 

Films directed by Juan Bosch
Films produced by Luciano Martino
Films produced by Ricardo Sanz
Films scored by Bruno Nicolai
1972 Western (genre) films
1972 films
Spanish Western (genre) films